The Pierre Percée is a natural arch located on a hill of Matheysine, in the Isère département, upon the commune of Pierre-Châtel. It belongs to the Seven Wonders of Dauphiné.

Internal gap is 3m. high.

Overall aspect evokes the one of a crouching monster and has been the origin of many local legends, where the Devil is usually involved.

See also
 Dauphiné Alps

Landforms of Isère
Tourist attractions in Isère
Natural arches of France
Rock formations of France
Landforms of Auvergne-Rhône-Alpes